The 2016 Ethias Trophy was a professional tennis tournament played on hard courts. It was the twelfth edition of the tournament which was part of the 2016 ATP Challenger Tour. It took place in Mons, Belgium between 3 October and 9 October 2016.

Singles main-draw entrants

Seeds

 1 Rankings are as of September 26, 2016.

Other entrants
The following players received wildcards into the singles main draw:
  Illya Marchenko
  Yannik Reuter
  Ruben Bemelmans
  Clément Geens

The following players received entry into the singles main draw using a protected ranking:
  Jürgen Melzer
  Jerzy Janowicz

The following players received entry using a special exempt into the singles main draw:
  Norbert Gombos
  Andrey Rublev

The following players received entry from the qualifying draw:
  Maxime Tabatruong
  Maxime Authom
  Yann Marti
  Sadio Doumbia

The following player entered as a lucky loser:
  Grégoire Barrère

Champions

Singles

  Jan-Lennard Struff def.  Vincent Millot 6–2, 6–0.

Doubles

  Julian Knowle /  Jürgen Melzer def.  Sander Arends /  Wesley Koolhof, 7–6(7–4), 7–6(7–4).

References

External links
Official Website

Ethias Trophy
2016 Ethias Trophy
Ethias Trophy
Ethias Trophy